The 1939–40 season was the 66th season of competitive football by Rangers, although with the outbreak of the Second World War, the competitive season was abandoned.

Overview
With the outbreak of the War on 3 September 1939, the season was suspended after five rounds of games played in the Scottish League Division One. The league was not officially competed for until season 1946–47 but there were unofficial regional leagues played during these years. This saw the club play what was known as wartime football.

Rangers played a total of five official competitive matches during the 1939–40 season.

Results
All results are written with Rangers' score first.

Scottish League Division One

Emergency Western League

Emergency War Cup

Play off final between West and East Divisions

Official appearances
(declared void along with fixtures)

See also
 1939–40 in Scottish football

Rangers F.C. seasons
Rangers
Scottish football championship-winning seasons